The HAL HAOP-27 Krishak was a military observation aircraft produced in India in the 1960s. It was initially developed by Hindustan Aeronautics as an enlarged, four-seat version of the HAL Pushpak light aircraft.

Two prototypes were built, with the first flying in November 1959 and the second in November 1960. With no interest from buyers, the project was shelved until the Indian Army issued a requirement in the early 1960s for an aircraft to replace the Auster AOP.6 and AOP.9s then serving in the observation role. The original Krishak design was slightly revised to meet the new specification, and the type was adopted into service in 1965. The Krishak was phased out in the mid-1970s when it was replaced by the HAL Cheetah.

Variants
Krishak Used a Continental 190 hp engine
Krishak Mk.2 Used a Continental 225 hp engine

Operators

Indian Army

Specifications (Krishak Mk.2)

See also

Notes

References

 
 

1950s Indian civil utility aircraft
Krishak
Single-engined tractor aircraft
Aircraft first flown in 1959